Dorsey or Dorsy is a small village and townland between Belleeks and Cullyhanna in County Armagh, Northern Ireland. It has an estimated population of 130-160 people and includes about 30-35 houses.

'Dorsey ramparts'

Na Doirse, the gateways, is an extensive earthwork which runs through the South Armagh area. The Dorsey Ramparts, or 'The Walls' as they are known locally, are said to have been a fortified frontier post to the kingdom whose capital was Emain Macha (Navan Fort), blocking an important historic route into South Armagh. It was built at a time when the power of the Ulster kingdom may have been at its strongest, around 100 BCE. Some time later Ulster was threatened from the south and it is speculated that Dorsey may have been incorporated into a more extensive defensive system known in Monaghan and further west as the Black Pig's Dyke.

Dorsey is one of the few monuments in the north of Ireland which have been confirmed as Iron Age in date. It is a group of linear earthworks with a perimeter of 4 km, enclosing an area of .. There have been a number of archaeological investigations of the Dorsey. There were a number of surveys and descriptions carried out from the 17th to 19th centuries. Much of this work was synthesised by Tempest (Tempest, 1930). Excavations at the South Gate, close to the current excavation, were carried out by Oliver Davies in 1938 (Davies, 1938). Davies also excavated at the north break in the Dorsey, and to the west of the ramparts around the watching stone in 1939 (Dorsey, 1940a). Excavations carried out by Chris Lynn in the 1977 provided dating evidence for the Dorsey. Felling dates of timbers from the southern part of the monument were dated by dendrochronology to 89±9 to 96±9 BC. (Lynn, 1992). Timbers from the northern section were dated by dendrochronology to felling dates of 135 ±9 to 150 ±9 BC (Baillie and Brown, 1989). It has been suggested that the Dorsey may not therefore be an enclosure but two lines of defence, the northern earlier and the southern one later (Lynn, 1989). (Above exert taken from Hurl et al, 2002, 1).

Facilities
It currently has:
 a community centre
 a chapel
 a Gaelic football pitch (Rory McGee Park)
 football teams (U8, U10, U14, U16, Minor and Senior levels)

Chapel
The chapel in Dorsey is over 50 years old and was built by local people. The site on which the chapel was built was donated by a local, Felix Mackin. Dorsey is part of the parish of Lower Creggan which incorporates Dorsey, Newtownhamilton and Cullyhanna.

Sport
Dorsey Emmet's GFC is a Gaelic Athletic Association club based in Dorsey and fielding football teams at Under-8, U10, U14, U16 and senior level.

Education
Dorsey does not have its own schools so its 4-11-year-olds usually go to St. Olivers Primary School in Carrickrovaddy or St. Brigid's Primary School in Belleeks, County Armagh.
Its 12-16-year-olds usually attend St. Joseph's High School in Crossmaglen or St. Paul's High School in Bessbrook.

References

 
 

Villages in County Armagh
Townlands of County Armagh
Archaeological sites in County Armagh
Ancient dikes
Prehistoric sites in Ireland
Linear earthworks